Tridrepana sadana is a moth in the family Drepanidae. It was described by Frederic Moore in 1865. It is found in China (Hubei, Tibet), India, Nepal and Myanmar.

Adults are similar to Tridrepana finita but are much bigger, the apex of the forewings is more falcate (sickle shaped), the postmedial line is double and there is a pale grey terminal line.

References

Moths described in 1865
Drepaninae